Volume 4: Hard Walls and Little Trips is the fourth extended play (EP) by American desert rock collective The Desert Sessions. Recorded in June 1998 at Monkey Studios, it was released by Man's Ruin Records on September 22, 1998. The album features twelve credited musicians, including Josh Homme, Nick Oliveri and Mario Lalli. It was later re-released with Volume 3: Set Coordinates for the White Dwarf!!! as Volumes 3 & 4.

Recording and release
The fourth Desert Sessions EP was recorded in sessions between June 23 and 26, 1998 at Monkey Studios in Palm Springs, California. The sessions were produced by Josh Homme, engineered and mixed by Homme and Steve Feldman, and featured a total of twelve credited musicians: Homme (drums, guitars and vocals), Larry Lalli, Craig Armstrong (both bass), Alfredo Hernández, Tony Tornay (both drums), Loo Balls, Chris Goss (both vocals), Jesse Hughes (guitars), T. Fresh (turntables), Nick Oliveri (guitar and vocals) and Mario Lalli (guitar, keyboards and vocals).

Volume 4 was initially released alone on vinyl by Man's Ruin Records on September 22, 1998. It later received a re-release with its predecessor, Volume 3: Set Coordinates for the White Dwarf!!!, on CD on October 27, 1998 as Volumes 3 & 4.

Critical reception

Music website AllMusic awarded Volume 4: Hard Walls and Little Trips three and a half out of five stars. Writer Ned Raggett said the following in his review of the album: "it's furry classic FM/bonghit-inspired action as usual on tracks like "Monster in the Parasol" and "Hogleg," plus the intentionally stupid punk-thrash "Jr. High Love"."

Track listing

Personnel
Personnel credits adapted from album liner notes.
Musicians
Josh Homme – drums (tracks 1 and 5), guitars (tracks 2 and 4), backing vocals (tracks 3 and 4), vocals (track 2)
Larry Lalli – bass (tracks 2, 3 and 4)
Mario Lalli – guitars (tracks 2, 3 and 4), vocals (track 4), keyboards (track 2)
Alfredo Hernández – drums (tracks 2 and 4)
Loo Balls – vocals (tracks 1 and 5)
Jesse Hughes – guitars (tracks 1 and 5)
Craig Armstrong – bass (tracks 1 and 5)
T. Fresh – turntables (tracks 1 and 5)
Chris Goss – vocals (track 2)
Nick Oliveri – guitar and vocals (track 3)
Tony Tornay – drums (track 3)

References

1998 EPs
The Desert Sessions albums
Man's Ruin Records EPs